The Chalet Amill in Yauco, Puerto Rico is a Beaux Arts style house that was built in 1914.  It was listed on the National Register of Historic Places in 1985.

It was built for Corsican immigrant Angel Antongiorgi Paoli, was given to his daughter and new husband in 1918, and was later converted to a hotel.

See also
National Register of Historic Places listings in Yauco, Puerto Rico

References

1914 establishments in Puerto Rico
Beaux-Arts architecture in Puerto Rico
Houses completed in 1914
National Register of Historic Places in Yauco, Puerto Rico
Houses on the National Register of Historic Places in Puerto Rico
Hotel buildings on the National Register of Historic Places in Puerto Rico